Conrad Burr (born November 23, 1968) is an American former stock car racing driver. He competed part-time in the Craftsman Truck Series from 2000 to 2003. Burr also drove numerous races in the NASCAR Southeast Series, particularly in the mid and late 1990s, where he ran nearly full seasons and picked up one win in 1999.

Racing career
Burr made his debut in 2000, when he drove the Jim Rosenblum Racing No. 28 Chevy into the field at Martinsville. He started the event in 31st, but only managed 25th. Yet, he did finish the event, a tall task at the short track.

Burr made another solo start in 2001, driving for his own team at Nashville. He started the event in last (36th) and only made it up to 34th before retiring early.

Burr returned to Rosenblum's team in 2002 for a five race schedule. He did well, finishing all but one race with the low-budget team. He had a good run at Las Vegas, earning his season best of 23rd, while at Texas Burr started 27th for his best start of the year. His 46th-place finish in points would prove to be his career high.

Burr made four starts as 2003 would prove to be his last year. Returning to a family-owned team, Burr earned two top-20 finishes in his starts. The better of those would prove to be a 15th at Dover, coupled with the 18th at Memphis. Also, at Charlotte, Burr earned his best career start of 25th.

Despite having his best year in 2003, Burr's team folded and he never made another NASCAR start after that.

Motorsports career results

NASCAR
(key) (Bold – Pole position awarded by qualifying time. Italics – Pole position earned by points standings or practice time. * – Most laps led.)

Craftsman Truck Series

References

External links
 

1968 births
NASCAR drivers
Living people
People from China Grove, North Carolina
Racing drivers from North Carolina